Presidential elections were held in Chile on 12 December 1999, with a runoff on 16 January 2000. The result was a victory for Ricardo Lagos of the Concertación alliance, who received 51% of the vote in the runoff.

Results

References

Presidential elections in Chile
1999 in Chile
2000 in Chile
Chile
Chile
Chile
Chile
Presidency of Eduardo Frei Ruiz-Tagle